Mhlambanyatsi Rovers is an Eswatinian association football club based in Mhlambanyatsi, which last played in the Swazi Premier League in the 2010-11 season.

Achievements
Swazi Premier League: 1
 2004.

Swazi Cup: 1
 1995.

Performance in CAF competitions
CAF Champions League: 1 appearance
2005 – Preliminary Round

CAF Cup: 1 appearance
1996 – First Round

Football clubs in Eswatini